The 2017 6 Hours of Nürburgring (formally the WEC 6 Hours of Nürburgring) was an endurance sports car racing event held at the Nürburgring, Nürburg, Germany on 16 July 2017. The race was won by the #2 Porsche 919 Hybrid, run by the factory Porsche LMP Team, with the #1 car finishing in 2nd place due to team orders being issued against them.

Race

Race result
Class winners are denoted in bold.

References

External links
 

Nurburgring
Nurburgring
6 Hours of Nürburgring
6 Hours of Nürburgring